The England Boxing National Amateur Championships Super-Heavyweight Championship formerly known as the ABA Championships is the primary English amateur boxing championship. It had previously been contested by all the nations of the United Kingdom.

History
The super-heavyweight division was inaugurated in 1982 and is currently the weight category of over 92 Kg. The championships are highly regarded in the boxing world and seen as the most prestigious national amateur championships.

Past winners

References

England Boxing